William III or William the Third may refer to:

Kings
 William III of Sicily (c. 1186–c. 1198)
 William III of England and Ireland or William III of Orange or William II of Scotland (1650–1702)
 William III of the Netherlands and Luxembourg (1817–1890)
 William IV of the United Kingdom, also known as William III in Scotland (1765–1837)

Nobles
 William III, Duke of Aquitaine (913–963)
 William III, Count of Toulouse, also styled William III of Provence (c. 970–1037)
 William III of Provence (died after 1037)
 William III of Weimar (died 1039)
 William III, Marquess of Montferrat (c. 970–1042)
 William II, Count of Provence, also numbered William III of Provence, (late 980s–1018)
 William III, Lord of Montpellier (died 1058)
 William V, Count of Angoulême, also known as William Taillefer III (1084–1118/20)
 William III of Forcalquier (died 1129)
 William III of Mâcon (1088–1156)
 William III, Count of Ponthieu (c. 1093–1172)
 William III, Count of Nevers (c. 1107–1161)
 William III, Count of Burgundy (c. 1110–1127)
 William III, Count of Jülich, ruled 1207–1219
 William II, Count of Flanders, also styled William III of Dampierre (1224–1251)
 William de Cantilupe (died 1254)
 William III of Baux (died 1257)
 William III  of Cagliari, ruled 1256–1258
 William III of Geneva (1280-1320)
 William I, Count of Hainaut or William III of Holland (c. 1286–1337)
 William I, Duke of Bavaria or William III of Hainaut (1330–1389)
 William III, Duke of Bavaria (1375–1435)
 William III of Isenburg-Wied, ruled 1413–1462
 William III, Landgrave of Thuringia (1425–1482)
 William III, Princely count of Henneberg-Schleusingen (1434–1480)
 William III, Landgrave of Hesse (1471–1500)

Horses
 William the Third (horse)

See also
William (disambiguation)